Jérôme Martin (born 1 June 1986) is a French former professional footballer who played as a defender.

References
 Jérôme Martin profile at foot-national.com
 
 

1986 births
Living people
French footballers
Association football midfielders
Ligue 2 players
Championnat National players
Championnat National 2 players
FC Libourne players
Dijon FCO players
US Orléans players
Tarbes Pyrénées Football players
Stade Bordelais (football) players
FC Le Mont players